The orders, decorations, and medals of Malaysia comprise a complex system by which Malaysians and qualified foreigners are honoured by the country's sovereign for actions or deeds that benefit their community or the country at large. Modelled on its British predecessor, the orders, decorations, and medals of Malaysia were created after formation of Malaysia. The honour system came to exist earlier during Federation of Malaya. During the British colonial times, honours were given under the British honour system. Johor was the first state to institute its own honours on 31 July 1880. Then, the other Malay states did the same.

The monarch is regarded as the fount of all honours—as he is the only person who may create new national honours—and acts as the Sovereign of all of Malaysia's orders; he will conduct inductions or present medals. In Malaysia, the monarch is the Yang di-Pertuan Agong, who also carries out investitures and distributes awards in the sovereign's name. As such, the administration of the honours system is carried out by the Ceremonial and International Conference Secretariat Division in Putrajaya, which is a part of the Prime Minister's Department. The Yang di-Pertuan Agong sets out via Office of the Keeper of the Rulers' Seal the Conference of Rulers' the order of precedence for the wearing of insignia, decorations, and medals.

The honours system consists of two levels Federal Honours and State Honours.

Federal orders, decorations, and medals

The Federal Honours are honours given by the Yang Di-Pertuan Agong to the military, police and civilians for service and special contributions to the country.

 Light green denotes orders, decorations, and medals that are not open for nomination application.

Honorary orders and medals

Military orders and medals

Police orders and medals

Scouts Association of Malaysia awards and honours

Girl Guides Association of Malaysia awards and honours

St. John Ambulance of Malaysia awards and honours

States and federal territories orders, decorations, and medals

The Malaysian states each have their own internal honours system, though they differ in some ways from their federal counterpart. Johor was the first to create its own honours in 1880. However, after the establishment of the Malaysian honours system in 1963, other states moved to initiate their own systems after the federal government refused to do so on their behalf. An agreement was eventually reached on the placement of the state honours in the Malaysian order of precedence for orders, decorations, and medals.

Imperial and foreign honours

State honours bestowed upon a Malaysian by a foreign government must be approved by the Government of Malaysia before the insignia, decoration, or medal may be worn.

See also

List of post-nominal letters (Malaysia)
Malay styles and titles

References

External links 
 

Orders, decorations, and medals of Malaysia
Civil awards and decorations of Malaysia
Malaysian honours list
Military awards and decorations of Malaysia
Orders of chivalry of Malaysia
Orders, decorations, and medals of states of Malaysia
Malaysia and the Commonwealth of Nations
.
.